Eulithidium diantha is a species of small sea snail with calcareous opercula, a marine gastropod mollusk in the family Phasianellidae, the pheasant snails.

Description
The height of the shell varies between 1.7 mm and 2.1 mm.

Distribution
This marine species occurs off the Galápagos Islands, off Cocos Island and off Costa Rica.

References

External links
 To Biodiversity Heritage Library (1 publication)
 To World Register of Marine Species
 

Phasianellidae
Gastropods described in 1970